Justin Hilliard (born March 25, 1997) is an American football linebacker who is a free agent. He played college football at Ohio State and was signed as an undrafted free agent by the San Francisco 49ers after the 2021 NFL Draft.

Education and college career
Hilliard graduated from St. Xavier High School in Cincinnati in 2015.

Hilliard was ranked as a fivestar recruit and one of the best linebackers in the 2015 class by 247Sports.com coming out of high school. He committed to Ohio State on July 2, 2014. He requested and was approved for a sixth year of eligibility before the 2020 season.

Professional career

San Francisco 49ers
Hilliard was signed as an undrafted free agent by the San Francisco 49ers on May 13, 2021. He was waived on August 31, 2021.

New York Giants
On September 1, 2021, Hilliard was claimed off waivers by the New York Giants. He was placed on injured reserve on October 15, 2021.

On June 17, 2022, Hilliard was suspended for the first two games of the 2022 regular season for violating the NFL's policy on performance-enhancing substances. On July 28, 2022, Hilliard was waived.

Kansas City Chiefs
On December 28, 2022, Hilliard was signed to the Kansas City Chiefs practice squad. Hilliard was waived by the Chiefs on January 6, 2023, after Matthew Wright was signed to the practice squad.

References

1997 births
Living people
Players of American football from Ohio
American football linebackers
St. Xavier High School (Ohio) alumni
Ohio State Buckeyes football players
San Francisco 49ers players
New York Giants players
Kansas City Chiefs players